The Walhalla Chronicle and Moondarra Advertiser, also published as the Walhalla Chronicle, was a newspaper published in Walhalla, Victoria, Australia from 1914 to 1915.

Digitisation 
The Walhalla Chronicle and the Walhalla Chronicle and Advertiser have been digitised and are available on Trove, as part of the Australian Newspapers Digitisation Project of the National Library of Australia.

See also 
 List of newspapers in Australia

References

External links 
 
 
 State Library of Victoria

Defunct newspapers published in Victoria (Australia)
Publications established in 1914
Publications disestablished in 1915